Carlos Mora Sabaté (born 19 March 1990) is a Spanish male volleyball player. He is part of the Spain men's national volleyball team. On club level he plays for SVG Lüneburg.

References

External links
 
 Carlos Mora Sabaté at the International Volleyball Federation
 
 Mora Sabate, Carlos at Volleyball-Bundesliga

1990 births
Living people
Place of birth missing (living people)
Spanish men's volleyball players
Mediterranean Games medalists in volleyball
Mediterranean Games silver medalists for Spain
Competitors at the 2009 Mediterranean Games
Sportspeople from Tarragona
Spanish expatriate sportspeople in Germany
Expatriate volleyball players in Germany